Ehretia cymosa is a small tree belonging to the Boraginaceae or borage family. It occurs over a wide range of habitat throughout  of western, central and eastern Africa, including Benin, Côte d'Ivoire, Cameroon, Ethiopia, Kenya, Comoros, Madagascar, Mascarenes, Zimbabwe and Mozambique.

Other names
Local names for this plant include Mpelu, Mnemvu (Tanzania), Murembu (Meru), Shekutu (Luhya), Yambu (Chagga), Mororwet (Nandy), Alébé (Baoulé), Bélékou, Blikou (Gouro), Grakou (Shien), Labassa (Ewé), Zomena, Zomali (Adja), Zoma, Zozoma, Myonma (Fon), Myoma (Sahouè), Jáà (Yoruba), and Ulaagaa (Arsi).

Leaves & roots are used for medical uses in traditional medicine.

References

cymosa
Trees of Africa
Flora of Benin
Flora of Cameroon
Flora of the Comoros
Flora of Ethiopia
Flora of Kenya
Flora of Ivory Coast
Flora of Madagascar
Flora of Mozambique
Flora of Zimbabwe
Medicinal plants of Africa
Garden plants of Africa
Ornamental trees